David G. Huizenga is an American civil servant who serves as the associate principal deputy administrator of the National Nuclear Security Administration, and was the acting United States secretary of energy.

Education 
Huizenga attended Montana State University, graduating with a bachelor's degree in chemistry, followed by a master's degree in chemical engineering.

Acting Secretary of Energy 
On January 20, 2021 following the inauguration of President Joe Biden, Huizenga was selected to act as interim United States Secretary of Energy, pending the confirmation of nominee Jennifer Granholm by the United States Senate.

References

External links

Year of birth missing (living people)
Living people
Montana State University alumni
United States Secretaries of Energy
Biden administration cabinet members